Edmund Plowden was a lawyer.

Edmund Plowden may also refer to:

Edmund Plowden (colonial governor), Lord Proprietor, Earl Palatine, Governor and Captain General of the Province of New Albion
Edmund Plowden Trust, publishers of Law & Justice (journal)